Nguyễn Hữu Cầu (1712–1751) was the leader of a rebellion of Tonkin peasantry in the 18th century.

Biography
Nguyễn Hữu Cầu was born in a poor family in Lôi Động (Tân An, Thanh Hà, Hải Dương, Việt Nam now). He was very good at martial art and swimming. Because of being poor, he was a robber. After that, he followed a revolution led by Nguyễn Cừ and became talented general. He was called Quận He.

The revolution came from Đồ Sơn (Hải Phòng), moved to Kinh Bac, Đông Kinh then Son Nam, Thanh Hoa, Nghe An. When Nguyễn Cừ, the leader of the revolution, was arrested, Nguyễn Hữu Cầu led the army to  Đồ Sơn and Vân Đồn.

He was captured by Phạm Đình Trọng, and executed in Thang Long in March 1751.

See also
Hoàng Công Chất
Nguyễn Danh Phương
Lê Duy Mật

References

《大越史記全書續編·卷之四》
Giai thoại văn học Việt Nam - Hoàng Ngọc Phách, Kiều Thu Hoạch, Nhà xuất bản Văn học, 1988
Việt Nam sử lược
Khâm định Việt sử thông giám cương mục
Biên niên lịch sử cổ trung đại Việt Nam - Viện Sử học, Nhà xuất bản Khoa học xã hội, 1988
Phong trào nông dân thế kỷ 18 (ở Đàng Ngoài) - Nguyễn Phan Quang, 2006

1751 deaths
Vietnamese rebels
People of Revival Lê dynasty
People from Haiphong
People executed by Vietnam
Executed Vietnamese people
1712 births